Yurga Machine-Building Plant is a company based in Yurga, Russia. Since 2015 it is part of Uralvagonzavod.

Yurga Machine-Building Plant produces missile launchers for Russian strategic forces and equipment for the Russian army. It is the largest industrial entity in Yurga.

The plant was established in September 1941, from the evacuated workers and machinery of the New Kramatorsk Machinebuilding Factory, the Bolshevik Plant of Leningrad and the Barrikady Plant of Stalingrad.

On February 18, 1943, the Yurginsky Machine-Building Plant was put into operation at existing enterprises.

The plant was liquidated in 2020.

References

External links
 Official website

Manufacturing companies of Russia
Companies based in Kemerovo Oblast
Uralvagonzavod
Ministry of General Machine-Building (Soviet Union)